Johann Andreas Kneucker (24 January 1862 – 22 December 1946) was a German botanical collector who was a native of Wenkheim, a village that today is part of the community of Werbach, Baden-Württemberg.

Up until 1923 he was a schoolteacher in Karlsruhe, afterwards working as curator of the natural history collection in Baden. During his career he collected plants in southern Europe and northern Africa (Sinai Peninsula).

Kneucker specialized in the botanical family Cyperaceae (sedges). He created several Exsiccatae collections, and a number of his specimens are now kept in the herbarium at the Staatliches Museum für Naturkunde in Karlsruhe. He was founder of the botanical magazine, Allgemeine Botanischen Zeitschrift.

In 1905 the algae genus Kneuckeria was named in his honor by Wilhelm Schmidle (1860–1951); the plant species Linaria kneuckeri (Bornm.) is also named after him.

Publications 
 Bemerkungen zu den "Gramineae exsiccatae" (1900).

References 

 University of Goettingen Department of Systematic Botany (biography)
 Aluka, Short Biography

External link

1862 births
1946 deaths
People from Main-Tauber-Kreis
People from the Grand Duchy of Baden
20th-century German botanists
19th-century German botanists